Charles Percy Fowler (1925 or 1926 – January 10, 2020), known as Bud Fowler, was a Canadian football player who played for the Toronto Argonauts. He won the Grey Cup with them in 1950.

References

1920s births
2020 deaths
Players of Canadian football from Ontario
Canadian football people from Toronto
Toronto Argonauts players